Henry Gale may refer to:
Henry Gale (cricketer) (1836–1898), English cricketer
Henry Gale (astrophysicist) (1874–1942), American astrophysicist and author
Henry Gale (British Army officer) (1883–1944), British Army officer
Uncle Henry (Oz), fictional character in the early 1900s L. Frank Baum Oz series
Ben Linus, fictional character in the 2006 television series Lost, who was introduced in the second season under the false name of "Henry Gale"